Sakarias Opsahl (born 17 July 1999) is a Norwegian football player currently playing as a midfielder for Tromsø. He is the older brother of fellow footballer Oskar Opsahl.

He joined Stabæk's youth setup from IL Heming, then Vålerenga's youth setup in 2016. He signed his first professional contract in August 2018. Opsahl made his debut for Vålerenga on 16 May 2019 against Strømsgodset, in a game that ended with a 2-0 win for Vålerenga.

Career statistics

References

1999 births
Living people
Footballers from Oslo
Norwegian footballers
Association football forwards
Vålerenga Fotball players
Ullensaker/Kisa IL players
Tromsø IL players
Eliteserien players
Norwegian First Division players
Norwegian Second Division players